The Detroit Police Department (DPD) is a municipal police force based in and responsible for the U.S. city of Detroit, Michigan. Founded in 1865, it has nearly 2,500 officers, making it the largest law enforcement organization in Michigan. The 2022 budget for the department was $341 million, including 28.7% of the city's general fund.

History

Establishment 
Town constables were appointed starting in 1801. A Police Commission was established in 1861 but the first forty officers did not begin work until 1865.

Technological innovations 
In 1921, the Detroit Police Department became the first police department in the country to utilize radio dispatch in their patrol cars. A historical marker at Belle Isle Park describes the new advancement in technology.

Role of women and minorities 
In 1893, the department hired its first female officer (Marie Owen) and its first black officer (L T Toliver). The Detroit Police Department established a Women's Division in 1921 that was tasked with cases of "child abuse, sexual assaults, juvenile delinquency, and checking establishments for illegal minors." Female officers were not allowed to work on criminal cases unless accompanied by male officers until 1973, after a series of discrimination lawsuits prompted changes in department policy.

Corruption charges 
In February 1940, Mayor Richard Reading, the Superintendent of Police, the county sheriff and over a hundred more were indicted on corruption charges. The Mayor was accused of selling promotions in the department. Eighty officers were accused of protecting illegal gambling operations in the city. In the end, the Mayor served three years in jail, ending in 1947.

Federal oversight
In 2000, the Detroit Free Press published a series of articles after a four-month investigation into fatal shootings by Detroit police officers. At the time, Detroit had the highest rate of police-involved shootings of any large city in the United States, surpassing New York, Los Angeles, and Houston. The city requested an investigation by the United States Department of Justice into the department's handling of deadly force incidents. By 2001, the Justice Department's investigation had uncovered issues with the department's arrest and detention practices as well. Between 2003 and 2014, the Detroit Police Department was placed under federal court oversight by the Justice Department as the result of allegations about excessive force, illegal arrests and improper detention. This process cost the city of Detroit more than $50 million. By 2014, the department's use of force had been "seriously reduced" and the U.S. District Judge overseeing the case stated that the Detroit Police Department had "met its obligations" for reforms.

Patrol geography changes 
In 2005, the department's thirteen precincts were consolidated into six larger districts as a cost-cutting measure. The department restored a number of precincts in 2009 after citizens complained about the change. In 2011, it was announced that the Detroit Police Department would be reverting to the original precinct structure, with officials citing "gap[s] in services" and concerns over the new command structure.

Headquarters relocation
On June 11, 2010 it was reported that the City of Detroit would acquire the former MGM Grand Detroit temporary casino building (originally the IRS Data Center) on John C. Lodge Freeway for $6.23 million and convert it into a new police headquarters complex which would also house a crime lab operated by the Michigan State Police. The renovated building also houses the Detroit Fire Department headquarters. The former casino building has  of space. The historic Detroit Police headquarters is in Greektown. On June 28, 2013, the new public safety headquarters opened for business.

2010s
On January 23, 2011, 38-year-old Lamar Moore walked into the 6th precinct with a pistol shotgun and shot and wounded 4 officers before being killed. 

On November 9, 2017, undercover police posing as drug dealers tried to arrest a group of undercover police posing as drug buyers, which led to a multi-person fight and several injuries. Police Chief James Craig told the Detroit Free Press that the brawl was "probably one of the most embarrassing things I've seen in this department."

2020 coronavirus pandemic
As the SARS-CoV-2 coronavirus continues to spread around the United States, several Detroit Police officers tested positive for being infected with the COVID-19 virus, and over 200 more were quarantined to prevent further spread of the virus in the Detroit metro area. Several infected people in the Detroit metro area had already succumbed to the virus and died after it was first discovered in the counties Detroit and its suburbs were located in. The Detroit Police suffered its first casualty to the virus with the death of a 38-year-old civilian dispatcher.

Fallen officers
Since 1878, the Detroit Police Department has lost 228 officers in the line of duty.

Rank structure and insignia

Demographics
Year 2013 breakdown of gender and ethnic minorities in the DPD.:

 Male: 75%
 Female: 25%
 African-American or Black: 63%
 White: 33%
 Hispanic, any race: 4%
 Asian: 0.4%

The Detroit Police Department has one of the largest percentages of Black officers of any major city police department, reflecting current overall city demographics. Lawsuits alleging discrimination stemming from the influence of affirmative action and allegations of race-based promotional bias for executive positions have surfaced repeatedly. As of 2008, the majority of upper command members in the Detroit PD were Black.

List of chiefs

See also

 Detroit Public Safety Headquarters
 Crime in Detroit, Michigan
 Government of Detroit
 List of law enforcement agencies in Michigan
 Lists of killings by law enforcement officers in the United States
 List of killings by law enforcement officers in the United States prior to 2009

Notes

References

External links

Government agencies established in 1865
Government of Detroit
Municipal police departments of Michigan
 
1865 establishments in Michigan